David Tatham  (born 28 June 1939) is an English former ambassador and Governor of the Falkland Islands, and editor of The Dictionary of Falklands Biography.

Career

David Everard Tatham was educated at St Lawrence College, Ramsgate, and Wadham College, Oxford. He joined the Diplomatic Service in 1960 and served at New York, Milan and, after studying at the Middle East Centre for Arab Studies, at Jeddah, Muscat and Dublin as well as at the FCO. He was Ambassador to the Yemen Arab Republic and concurrently to the Republic of Djibouti 1984–87; head of the Falkland Islands department at the FCO 1987–90; Ambassador to the Lebanese Republic 1990–92; Governor of the Falkland Islands (and commissioner for South Georgia and the South Sandwich Islands) 1992–96; and High Commissioner to the Democratic Socialist Republic of Sri Lanka and concurrently to the Republic of Maldives 1996–99.

Tatham retired from the Diplomatic service on leaving Sri Lanka and was adviser on diplomatic training to the Palestinian Authority in 2000. He was district manager for the 2001 United Kingdom census in the area of Ledbury (where he lived) and Ross-on-Wye, and then embarked on The Dictionary of Falklands Biography, including South Georgia, which was published in 2008. He has been chairman of the Falkland Islands Shackleton Scholarship Fund in the UK since 1999, and was chairman of the Falkland Islands Association 2004–11.

Tatham was among 52 senior British diplomats who in 2004 signed a letter to Tony Blair, then British Prime Minister, criticising his Middle East policy. The letter was described as "unprecedented in scope and scale".

Honours

The herb Phlomis tathamiorum is named after Tatham "for voicing the imminence for caring for Lebanon's nature through his activity in Lebanon, and for assisting the authors at starting work for seed banking of Lebanon's natural beauties at Kew Gardens as well as collaborating with England's National Trust to help create a similar entity for Lebanon."

Tatham was appointed CMG in the 1991 New Year Honours.

References

TATHAM, David Everard, Who's Who 2017, A & C Black, 2017 (online edition, Oxford University Press, 2016)

1939 births
Living people
People educated at St Lawrence College, Ramsgate
Alumni of Wadham College, Oxford
Members of HM Diplomatic Service
Ambassadors of the United Kingdom to Yemen
Ambassadors of the United Kingdom to Djibouti
Ambassadors of the United Kingdom to Lebanon
Governors of the Falkland Islands
High Commissioners of the United Kingdom to Sri Lanka
High Commissioners of the United Kingdom to the Maldives
British biographers
Companions of the Order of St Michael and St George
20th-century British diplomats